Rolf Aas (12 October 1891 – 9 April 1946) was a Norwegian football player. He was born in Kristiania. He played as a winger for Mercantile and Lyn. He was capped 19 times for Norwegian national team scoring two goals, and played at the Antwerp Olympics in 1920, where the Norwegian team reached the quarter finals. He died in Oslo in 1946.

References

1891 births
1946 deaths
Norwegian footballers
Norway international footballers
Footballers at the 1920 Summer Olympics
Olympic footballers of Norway
Association football wingers
Footballers from Oslo